de Havilland a defunct British aviation manufacturer established in 1920.

de Havilland may also refer to:

Organisations
 de Havilland Engine Company, offshoot of the original British de Havilland aircraft building company later taken over by Rolls-Royce
 de Havilland Canada, former subsidiary of the original, now independent and the only remaining aircraft manufacturer bearing this name
 de Havilland Australia former subsidiary, later merged into Boeing Australia
 De Havilland Aviation, a jet engineering company founded in 1988, based at Bournemouth Airport, England
 DeHavilland, a UK-based political information company
 De Havilland College, a UK college until 1991 and now the Welwyn Garden City Campus of Oaklands College

People
 Sir Geoffrey de Havilland (1882–1965), founder of the aircraft company
 Geoffrey Raoul de Havilland (1910–1946), test pilot, son of Sir Geoffrey
 Hereward de Havilland (1894–1976), British aviator, brother of Sir Geoffrey
 Joan de Beauvoir de Havilland (1917–2013), British-American actress, daughter of Walter and sister of Olivia
 John Thomas de Havilland (1918–1943), test pilot, son of Sir Geoffrey
 Olivia de Havilland (1916–2020), British-American actress, daughter of Walter and sister of Joan
 Sir Peter de Havilland (1747–1821), Bailiff of Guernsey and great-grandfather of Walter
 Thomas Fiott de Havilland (1775–1866), army officer and son of Sir Peter
 Walter Augustus de Havilland (1872–1968), British patent attorney and Go player, half-uncle of Sir Geoffrey
 William Lee de Havilland (1994-), English professional footballer

See also

 
 De Havilland family
 Havilland Hall, Guernsey
 Haviland (disambiguation)